John Leigh (born 1965) is a New Zealand actor. He has had roles in New Zealand TV shows such as Shortland Street, Mercy Peak and as Sparky in Outrageous Fortune. He is a voice actor, and worked for the Power Rangers franchise since 2003 (after the franchise had moved to New Zealand). He has appeared in films including the role of Háma in The Lord of the Rings: The Two Towers and as the bar-owner in Stickmen, and in soap satire Serial Killers. In 2014 he acted in and wrote the short comedy film Snowmen.

He is also a stage actor and started on stage in Wellington before getting film and television roles. He is based in Auckland. Theatre shows he has appeared in with the Auckland Theatre Company include Kings of the Gym, Horseplay, Stones in His Pockets, Death of a Salesman and All My Sons.

Filmography

Film

Television

Power Rangers Series
Power Rangers Ninja Storm (2003) - Terramole / Toxipod / Super Toxipod / Dr. Belrab (voice)
Power Rangers Dino Thunder (2004) - Insectolite (voice)
Power Rangers Mystic Force (2006) - Octomus The Master (voice)
Power Rangers Operation Overdrive (2007) - Brownbeard
Power Rangers Samurai (2011) - Fisherman / Steeleto (voice)
Power Rangers Megaforce (2014) - Damaras (voice)
Power Rangers Dino Fury (2021) - Wreckmate (voice)

References

External links

1965 births
Living people
New Zealand male film actors
New Zealand male television actors
New Zealand male voice actors
New Zealand male soap opera actors
20th-century New Zealand male actors
21st-century New Zealand male actors